Thanh Sơn may refer to several places in Vietnam, including:

Thanh Sơn District, a rural district of Phú Thọ District
Thanh Sơn, Ninh Thuận, a ward of Phan Rang-Tháp Chàm
Thanh Sơn, Uông Bí, a ward of Uông Bí in Quảng Ninh Province
Thanh Sơn, Bắc Giang, a township of Sơn Động District
Thanh Sơn, Phú Thọ, a township and capital of Thanh Sơn District
Thanh Sơn, Haiphong, a commune of Kiến Thụy District
Thanh Sơn, Định Quán, a commune of Định Quán District in Đồng Nai Province
Thanh Sơn, Tân Phú, a commune of Tân Phú District, Đồng Nai
Thanh Sơn, Hà Nam, a commune of Kim Bảng District
Thanh Sơn, Hải Dương, a commune of Thanh Hà District
Thanh Sơn, Lạng Sơn, a commune of Hữu Lũng District
Thanh Sơn, Nghệ An, a commune of Thanh Chương District
Thanh Sơn, Ba Chẽ, a commune of Ba Chẽ District in Quảng Ninh Province
Thanh Sơn, Như Xuân, a commune of Như Xuân District in Thanh Hóa Province
Thanh Sơn, Tĩnh Gia, a commune of Tĩnh Gia District in Thanh Hóa Province
Thanh Sơn, Trà Vinh, a commune of Trà Cú District